Vorderwaldberg is a dispersed settlement in the Oberpinzgau, the upper Salzach valley and the district of Zell am See/Pinzgau, and also a village in the municipality of Wald im Pinzgau, on the southern edge of the Kitzbühel Alps in Austria.

Geography 

History 
Vorderwaldberg lies on the old mule track (Saumpfad) from Mittersill as a trading hub on the route over the Gerlos Pass (Pinzgauer Höhe) to Zell am Ziller. It was upgraded into a cart track in 1631. In 1962 the new Gerlos Alpine Road (Gerlos Alpenstraße) via Krimml (today part of the B 165 Mittersill – Hainzenberg) was opened, that had been planned by graduate engineer Franz Wallack, the builder of the Großglockner High Alpine Road (Großglockner Hochalpenstraße). Consequently the Old Gerlos Road (Alte Gerlosstraße, today the L 133) lost its importance.

Tourism and places of interest 
The Sixt Chapel (Sixtkapelle) on the Sonnberg, below the Vorderwaldberg, on the Old Gerlos Road. Below the  Sixtus Chapel lies the Augentrost Chapel (Augentrostkapelle) which is also worth a visit.

The Arno Trail (Arnoweg) runs through this village, from Hinterwaldberg and Lahn, as a climb to the Pinzgauer Spaziergang.

References 

 Sources

Wald im Pinzgau
Zell am See District
Kitzbühel Alps